United Nations Security Council resolution 2082 was adopted in 2012.

See also
 List of United Nations Security Council Resolutions 2001 to 2100 (2011-2012)

References

External links
Text of the Resolution at undocs.org

2012 United Nations Security Council resolutions
December 2012 events